Wisconsin's 4th congressional district is a congressional district of the United States House of Representatives in Wisconsin, encompassing a part of Milwaukee County and including almost all of the city of Milwaukee (except the slivers of the city in Waukesha and Washington counties), as well as its working-class suburbs of Cudahy, St. Francis, South Milwaukee, and West Milwaukee. Recent redistricting has added the Milwaukee County North Shore communities of Glendale, Shorewood, Whitefish Bay, Fox Point, Bayside, and Brown Deer to the district. It is currently represented by Gwen Moore, a Democrat.

In the 21st century, this has been the most Democratic congressional district in Wisconsin. John Kerry won 69% of the vote here in 2004. Barack Obama also swept the district in 2008, by a three-to-one margin over John McCain, with 75.39% of the vote to McCain's 23.61%.

Before the 2000 census, the 4th covered much of south Milwaukee, and extended into eastern Waukesha County. After Wisconsin lost a district in the 2000 census, the 4th was cut back to a Milwaukee County district.

Counties and municipalities within the district

Milwaukee County
 Bayside, Brown Deer, Fox Point, Glendale, Milwaukee, River Hills, Shorewood, Wauwatosa, West Allis (half), West Milwaukee, and Whitefish Bay.

Election results from presidential races

List of members representing the district

Recent election results

2002 district boundaries (2002–2011)

2011 district boundaries (2012–2021)

See also

Wisconsin's congressional districts
List of United States congressional districts

References 

 Congressional Biographical Directory of the United States 1774–present

Specific

External links 
Wisconsin's 4th Congressional District

04